Yanceyville Historic District is a national historic district located in Yanceyville, Caswell County, North Carolina, USA. It encompasses 11 contributing buildings in the county seat of Yanceyville. It includes notable examples of Greek Revival style architecture. In addition to the separately listed Caswell County Courthouse, other notable buildings include the Thornton House, Paul Haralson House, Jeremiah Graves House (Dongola), Dr. Nathaniel Roan House, Presbyterian Church, Kerr House, Thomas D. Johnston House, and the brick store.

It was added to the National Register of Historic Places in 1973.

References

External links
 

Historic American Buildings Survey in North Carolina
Historic districts on the National Register of Historic Places in North Carolina
Greek Revival architecture in North Carolina
Buildings and structures in Caswell County, North Carolina
National Register of Historic Places in Caswell County, North Carolina